There are at least 69 named lakes and reservoirs in Gallatin County, Montana.

Lakes
 Ainger Lake, el. 
 Albino Lake, el. 
 Angler Lake, location unknown, el. 
 Arden Lake, el. 
 Arrow Lake, el. 
 Axolotl Lake, el. 
 Bear Lakes, el. 
 Big Bear Lake, el. 
 Big Horn Lake, location unknown, el. 
 Blackmore Lake, el. 
 Buffalo Horn Lakes, el. 
 Cascade Lakes, el. 
 Coffin Lake, el. 
 Crater Lake, el. 
 Crescent Lake, el. 
 Crystal Lake, el. 
 Deer Lake, el. 
 Dudley Lake, el. 
 Earthquake Lake, el. 
 Elf Lake, el. 
 Emerald Lake, el. 
 Fairy Lake, el. 
 Flanders Lake, el. 
 Frazier Lake, el. 
 Fridley Lakes, el. 
 Frog Pond, el. 
 Golden Trout Lakes, el. 
 Grace Lake, el. 
 Grayling Lake, el. 
 Heather Lake, el. 
 Hell Roaring Lake (Montana), el. 
 Hidden Lakes, el. 
 Hyalite Lake, el. 
 Johnson Lake, el. 
 Jumbo Lake, el. 
 Juncus Lake, el. 
 Lake Elsie (Montana), el. 
 Lake of the Pines, el. 
 Lava Lake, el. 
 Lillian Lake, el. 
 Little Bear Lake, el. 
 Lizard Lakes, el. 
 Lomna Lake, el. 
 Marble Lake, el. 
 Meadow Lake, el. 
 Minnie Lake, el. 
 Moon Lake, el. 

 Mystic Lake, el. 
 North Fork Lake (Montana), el. 
 Palace Lake, el. 
 Park Lake, el. 
 Pine Lake, el. 
 Pioneer Lakes, el. 
 Ramshorn Lake, el. 
 Rat Lake, el. 
 Rathbone Lake, el. 
 Rose Lake, el. 
 Swim Lake, el. 
 Thompson Lake (Gallatin County, Montana), el. 
 Turquoise Lake, el. 
 Twin Lakes, el. 
 Upper Coffin Lake, el. 
 Whits Lakes, el.

Reservoirs
 Hebgen Lake, el. 
 Hyalite Reservoir, el. 
 Lyman Creek Reservoir, el. 
 Meadow Lake, el. 
 Mystic Lake, el. 
 Old Cooper Reservoir, el.

See also
 List of lakes in Montana

Notes

Bodies of water of Gallatin County, Montana
Gallatin